Patricia Ford, Lady Fisher ( Smiles; 5 April 1921 – 23 May 1995), was briefly an Ulster Unionist Party politician in the House of Commons of the United Kingdom. She was the first woman Member of Parliament from Northern Ireland, and the second woman to be returned to a seat in Westminster from a constituency on the island of Ireland (the first to take her seat).

Early life 
She was born at Donaghadee, County Down, and educated at Bangor Collegiate School, Glendower Preparatory School, London, and abroad. Her father was Ulster Unionist MP Sir Walter D. Smiles and her mother, Margaret Heigway.

Career 
Ford returned from living in Cheshire upon her father's death in the  disaster in January 1953 and was returned unopposed to Parliament from his North Down constituency. In her maiden speech to the House she was required to apologise for an article she had written in the Sunday Express in which she mentioned that Bessie Braddock and Edith Summerskill had been snoring whilst asleep in the lady members' room. The matter was referred to the Committee for Privileges.

Ford was a strong proponent of equal pay between the sexes and rode in a horse-drawn carriage to Parliament to draw attention to the matter. She retired at the 1955 general election. In 1972 she founded and was co-chairman of the Women Caring Trust, now Hope for Youth Northern Ireland. She was expelled from the Orange Order's women's section for attending a wedding at the Brompton Oratory.

Personal life 
In 1941, she married cricketer Neville Montagu Ford, son of the Very Rev. Lionel George Bridges Justice Ford and grandson of 4th Lord Lyttelton. They had two daughters: Sarah, who married Sir Michael Grylls and whose son is explorer Bear Grylls, and Mary Rose, who is married and has two daughters.

Patricia Ford was divorced from her first husband and married Sir Nigel Fisher, MP, in 1956, acquiring the courtesy title of Lady Fisher and becoming stepmother to Mark Fisher, later a Labour Party MP.

References

External links
Hope for Youth Northern Ireland (official website). Accessed 23 November 2022.
Image, npg.org.uk. Accessed 23 November 2022.
 Patricia Ford MP - first woman to sit for a Northern Ireland constituency, ukvote100.org. 15 September 2016.
 

1921 births
1995 deaths
Members of the Parliament of the United Kingdom for County Down constituencies (since 1922)
Female members of the Parliament of the United Kingdom for Northern Irish constituencies
Ulster Unionist Party members of the House of Commons of the United Kingdom
People from Donaghadee
People educated at Glendower Preparatory School
Politicians from County Down
UK MPs 1951–1955
20th-century women politicians from Northern Ireland
Wives of knights
Spouses of British politicians